Anne Lise Frøkedal known by her stage name Frøkedal is a folk-pop, singer-songwriter from Norway.

Previously known as a member of acclaimed Norwegian bands Harry's Gym and "I Was A King", in 2015 she debuted as a solo artist. 
Releasing a series of singles and an EP in 2015, she released her debut album Hold On Dreamer in 2016. The album was later nominated for a Spellemannprisen - also known as the Norwegian Grammys - for best Indie Album Of The Year 2017.

In 2017, Frøkedal announced her return with the release of singles Stranger, and double single LTF/Cracks.

Frøkedal released her second album, 'How We Made It' on August 31, 2018. It received support from The 405, CLASH Magazine and The Line of Best Fit.

Discography

Albums

Extended plays

Singles

References

Norwegian pop singers
1981 births
Living people
People from Etne
21st-century Norwegian singers
21st-century Norwegian women singers
Propeller Recordings artists